The Fighting Marshal is a 1931 American Pre-Code Western film directed by D. Ross Lederman and starring Tim McCoy.

Plot
Tim Benton (Tim McCoy) is falsely accused of killing his own father and escapes from prison along with brutish Red Larkin (Matthew Betz). The fugitives head for the former Benton mine now operated by the villainous John Sebastian (Ethan Laidlaw), where Tim plans to rob the payroll. En route, they are discovered by Bob Dinsmore (Anders Van Haden), the new marshal of Silver City, who is killed by Red.

Cast
 Tim McCoy as Tim Benton
 Dorothy Gulliver as Alice Wheeler
 Matthew Betz as Red Larkin
 Mary Carr as Aunt Emily
 Pat O'Malley as Deputy Ed Myers
 Edward LeSaint as Warden Decker
 Harry Todd as Pop

References

External links
 
 
 
 

1931 films
1931 Western (genre) films
American Western (genre) films
American black-and-white films
1930s English-language films
Films directed by D. Ross Lederman
Columbia Pictures films
1930s American films